Immigration under New Labour from 1997 to 2010 was the immigration policy under the government of Tony Blair and then subsequently the continuation of large scale immigration under Gordon Brown.

Under New Labour net migration to the United Kingdom quadrupled from around 50,000 every year before 1997 to around 200,000 averaging out over 1997 to 2010. It continued at this large scale pace for the remainder of the Tony Blair's and Gordon Brown's time as Prime Minister and large scale migration has subsequently been continued by governments after. Immigration from non-EU countries and the European Union itself substantially rose and has been described as one of the largest mass population movements to the country since the Second World War.

During this period around 2.2 million immigrants entered the United Kingdom, the salience of the issue of immigration rose to one of the most prominent political issues in the country, and the impact of the net increase has changed the ethnic demography of the United Kingdom.

Background 

Immigration to the United Kingdom from the mid to late 1970's onwards as a joint silent policy decision by both Labour and Conservative governments immigration had roughly rested at around a total of 50,000 net migration to the country, Will Somerville describes the country, before 1997, as one of 'zero migration'; "Of all liberal democracies, Britain had succeeded in restricting immigration where other countries had failed."

From the 1990s onwards under John Major asylum seeker requests had started to rise in prominence and backlash against the issue had prompted action by the government to stop the sudden influx brought about by events in Yugoslavia and elsewhere. In 1993 the government enacted the Asylum and Immigration Appeal Act (which was one of the first of legislation to deal with the issue of Asylum) and then in 1996 enacted the Asylum and Immigration Act which cut benefits from asylum seekers and shifted funding for the issue onto local authorities.

Increase in immigration

Immigration from 1997 to 2004 

In 1997, Tony Blair was elected following the general election that year who started to dismantle restrictions on immigration, something not outlined in party's manifesto, at the beginning of his term enacting major reforms to the country's immigration system and policies. One such major example was dismantling the primary purpose rule in 1997, which was used to stop foreign spouses of immigrant workers and potential abuse of the system, for example workers from abroad who once settled in the UK, married someone from their home countries, from coming to the country.

From 2000's onwards, major government focus was directed towards immigration as an issue and the Labour government introduced a number of measures to facilitate the entry of migrant workers. During this time a number of reports came out to elaborate on government strategy going forward and to test the feasibility of increased migration to the country. One such report produced in 2000 by the Department for Trade and Industry, titled 'Our competitive future: building the knowledge driven economy' outlined whether or not there was capability to lower the boundaries for skilled professionals which was influenced significantly by then Immigration and Asylum minister Barbara Roche and Minister for Competitiveness Alan Johnson.

This report's queries were essentially green-lit with the Innovators Scheme in the summer of that year, which was considered to be one of the first 'policy bridgeheads' for increased migration. This line, that the Labour Government was open to more migration for the need of economic reasons was also outlined in their first public speech by Immigration minister Barbara Roche in September 2000 to the British Bankers Association, Institute for Public Policy Research and Kingsley Napley, calling for termed 'managed migration'.

From October onwards, criteria for gaining a work permit in the country were relaxed from needing a qualification in a field of work and two years of experience to just a qualification. The expansion of the work permit system was enhanced further with multiple-entry  work permits and an easier administrative system to work through applications and self-certification of workers by large businesses and corporations was piloted as well. This scheme gave many preferences to employers looking to employ from abroad and an objective to help fill jobs of large businesses to senior government officials and prioritise a strong employer focus behind the agenda. The success in terms of pure numbers using the program worked, in 1997 62,975 people were awarded the work permit's but by 2005 this number had doubled to 137,035 work permits granted.

High skilled migration needs and policies were created to deal with the issue, two schemes were implemented, the Innovators Scheme, which was announced in September 2000 and the High Skilled Migrant Programme.

Another report created in 2001 by a Labour think-tank called the Performance and Innovation Unit, titled 'Migration: an economic and social analysis' created by members of the Home Office and the PIU lead by Jonathon Portes outlined several reasons as to why the government should take a more expansive approach to migration, claiming that "there was little evidence that British workers were harmed by [immigration]".

Expansion of the EU, 2004-2007 
In 2004, former eastern bloc countries such as Poland, Hungary, Czech Republic, Slovakia, Slovenia and the three Baltic countries of Estonia, Lithuania and Latvia which were a part of the Soviet Union itself and Malta and Cyprus joined the EU. These countries, nicknamed the 'A8' (accession eight) and their joining of the European Union opened up a large labour pool low skilled workers from Eastern Europe of which wanted to migrate to the more economically prosperous Western Europe. To counter this, policy decisions within Western European countries were permitted to allow termed 'transitional controls' to halt the flow of migrants but three countries within the EU did not decide to do this. These were the United Kingdom, Sweden and Ireland. The Home Office and David Blunkett in 2003 did not predict that there would be a substational increase in migration from these new countries, in fact it estimated that around relatively small amount of 5,000 to 13,000 net immigrants per year averaged over a ten-year period would arrive to the country, however this was not the case. Estimations by the Office of National Statistics in 2015 roughly put the number at 453,000 immigrants from the A8 arrived in the UK over a period from 2004 to 2012 (averaging at around 45,000 a year), however these figures have been revised upwards in recent years.

Brown elected Prime Minister, 2007-2010 

Following Tony Blair's resignation as Prime Minister in 2007, Gordon Brown was elected Leader of the Labour Party unanimously and assumed the role of Prime Minister, the rhetoric behind the Labour government's policy on immigration shifted and more attention in the public, however actual policy on the topic remained unchanged and net migration remained relatively the same as it was under Blair, with a slight decrease with the global financial crash in 2008 and transitional restrictions were used on Bulgarian and Romanian migrants, following their countries entry to the European Union in 2007.

Reasons for increase 
New Labour's reasons to increase migration to the country were three key defining reasons; according to Erica Consterdine the outline behind the three was; first the "party’s neo-liberal economic programme, hinging on measures to counter inflation and promote flexibility in the labour market", secondly Labour's commitment to the idea of a "cosmopolitan notion of citizenship and integration." and thirdly and lastly was "an uncompromising belief in the inevitability of globalisation."

Globalisation and economic demand 
Globalisation as a factor (and premise for increased migration) influenced the New Labour government into adopting a more liberal policy of open borders. Will Somerville describes this as one of the 'macro forces' which influenced the government in this direction. While Erica Consterdine stated that it was the government's "an uncompromising belief in the inevitability of globalisation" which influenced them in this manner, and this belief 'trickled down into many public policies' such as immigration for example.

Influence of the European Union 
The European Union as a trans-national body also had influence over the government's policy decisions on immigration which Will Somerville also describes as one of the 'macro forces' which influenced New Labour into more open borders stance.

Cosmopolitanism as a part of immigration policy 
Policies on the left of the social axis on the issues of race also factored into New Labour's approach to migration as an issue. New Labour developed close links to organisations such as Joint Council for the Welfare of Immigrants, National Assembly against Racism and the 1990 Trust for example which influenced its perspective on how to look at the immigration issue itself.

Personalities within the Labour Party 
Many personalities in the Labour Party or affiliated which had sway over the government who supported immigration also had reasons for which were more suited to a cosmopolitan agenda for immigration support, on either issues such as racial justice or the advancement of a multicultural/multiracial nation. Will Somerville designates Barbara Roche and Alan Johnson as two examples of this, while Alan Johnson supported immigration as a way to further the interests of large businesses, Barbara Roche mostly saw immigration in the eyes of advancing a social agenda of cosmopolitanism, and in large part was driven by ideology and in general was a strong supporter of migration. For example, she viewed and promoted migration to that of countries like the United States, Australia, Canada and New Zealand and saw the UK as a migration state in of itself.

Impact and legacy

Salience of the issue 
Salience of the issue of immigration became larger from the 2000s onwards as public conscience about the rise of immigration had begun to be noticed and the 2001 race riots in Bradford and Oldham put race at the centre of the debate. Using data from the Migration Observatory from the University of Oxford. Immigration as an issue in January 1997 only was the most important issue to 2% of the population, but by January 2014, it was the most important issue to 41% of the population.

Political impact 
Support for anti-immigration policies led to backlash against the Conservative Party during the 2005 general election. Staff and students at City and Islington College lodged complaints of racism against a nearby Conservative poster, which read "It's not racist to impose limits on immigration" and ""I mean, how hard is it to keep a hospital clean?"

2009 BNP Question Time Episode 

A large portion of the controversial Question Time episode in October 2009 which featured the British National Party's leader Nick Griffin was dedicated to the issue of immigration.

In November of that year Alan Johnson admitted that his party had 'got it wrong on immigration' and handled the issue poorly.

After New Labour 
Ed Miliband admitted in 2011 that his party had 'got it wrong on immigration'. BBC Political Journalist Nick Robinson in 2014 in a documentary focusing on the effects of migration from the New Labour period claimed that there 'had not been a proper debate on immigration for many many years' in part because of Enoch Powell's River of Blood Speech in 1968.

Claimed plot behind increase 

In October 2009, in an article released by the Evening Standard, titled 'Don't listen to the whingers - London needs immigrants' by Andrew Neather, who had been an advisor to Home Secretary's Jack Straw and David Blunkett and Immigration Minister Barbara Roche, claimed that there was a deliberate policy to 'make the UK multicultural' and that quote;It didn't just happen: the deliberate policy of ministers from late-2000 until at least February last year, when the Government introduced a points-based system, was to open up the UK to mass migration. (...)

So why is it that ministers have been so very bad at communicating this? I wonder because I wrote the landmark speech given by then immigration minister Barbara Roche in September 2000, calling for a loosening of controls. It marked a major shift from the policy of previous governments: from 1971 onwards, only foreigners joining relatives already in the UK had been permitted to settle here. (...)

But the earlier drafts I saw also included a driving political purpose: that mass immigration was the way that the Government was going to make the UK truly multicultural.

I remember coming away from some discussions with the clear sense that the policy was intended – even if this wasn't its main purpose – to rub the rights nose in diversity and render their arguments out of date. That seemed to me to be a manoeuvre too far.The claim of an inherent plot was quickly picked up by the media. However a few days later Andrew Neather later claimed that his words had been taken out of context;Somehow this has become distorted by excitable right-wing newspaper columnists into being a 'plot' to make Britain multicultural. There was no plot.

Demographic impact 
Demographically, the immigrant population increased from 2.9 million in 1995 to 5.4 million in 2008 and the overall population increasing from 58 million in 2001 to 63 million in 2011. 

On the origin of migration as well has the complexion changed, in the 1980s and 1990s, a third of migrants came from either Ireland or India however these two countries by 2008 only accounted for 12% of migrants arriving, increasingly more migrants from non-European countries started to arrive and became more prominent in the composition of immigrants arriving. In 1999 the Labour Force Survey reported that the country's behind the five largest groups of migrant growth were India, Ireland, Pakistan, Germany and Bangladesh, in 2009, this had changed to India, Poland, Pakistan, Germany and South Africa.

References 

Race relations in the United Kingdom
New Labour
Tony Blair
Gordon Brown